Incline (formerly, Indian Flat) is an unincorporated community in Mariposa County, California.

A post office operated at Incline from 1924 to 1953. The community named after the lumber incline near the original town site.

References

Unincorporated communities in California
Unincorporated communities in Mariposa County, California